The following is a list of football stadiums in Cameroon, with a capacity of at least 5,000 spectators. Some stadiums used for other purposes like Athletics, Concerts, Politics and Cultural Events.

Stadiums in use

Higher Capacities

Future stadiums

See also
List of African stadiums by capacity
List of stadiums by capacity

References

External links
Cameroon at WorldStadiums.com

 
Cameroon
Football stadiums